Bald Hill may refer to:

 Bald Hill (Australia), a popular lookout in Illawarra, New South Wales, Australia
 Bald Hill (Farmingville, New York), One of the highest points on Long Island, New York, US
Bald Hill (Hudson Highlands), hill in New York state
 Bald Hill (Mendocino County), hill in California, US
 Bald Hill (Washington County, Missouri), US
 Bald Hill (Snohomish County, Washington), US
 Bald Hill, in San Anselmo, Marin County, California; see list of summits of the San Francisco Bay Area, US
 Bald Hill, a mountain summit in Monroe, New York, US
 Bald Hill Range, a mountain range in Middlesex County, Connecticut, US
 Bald Hill in Mineral County, Montana, US
 Bald Hill, Russia - within the Duderhof Heights

See also
 Bald Hills (disambiguation)